In mathematics, the term Riemann–Hilbert correspondence refers to the correspondence between regular singular flat connections on algebraic vector bundles and representations of the fundamental group, and more generally to one of several generalizations of this.
The original setting appearing in Hilbert's twenty-first problem was for the Riemann sphere, where it was about the existence of systems of linear regular differential equations with prescribed monodromy representations. 
First the Riemann sphere may be replaced by an arbitrary Riemann surface and then, in higher dimensions, Riemann surfaces are replaced by complex manifolds of dimension > 1. 
There is a correspondence between certain systems of partial differential equations (linear and having very special properties for their solutions) and possible monodromies of their solutions.

Such a result was proved for algebraic connections with regular singularities by Pierre Deligne (1970, generalizing existing work in the case of Riemann surfaces) and more generally for regular holonomic D-modules by Masaki Kashiwara (1980, 1984) and Zoghman Mebkhout (1980, 1984) independently.
In the setting of nonabelian Hodge theory, the Riemann-Hilbert correspondence provides a complex analytic isomorphism between two of the three natural algebraic structures on the moduli spaces, and so is naturally viewed as a nonabelian analogue of the comparison isomorphism between De Rham cohomology and singular/Betti cohomology.

Statement
Suppose that X is a smooth complex algebraic variety.

Riemann–Hilbert correspondence (for regular singular connections): 
there is a functor Sol called the local solutions functor, that is an equivalence from the category of flat connections on algebraic vector bundles on X with regular singularities to the category of local systems of finite-dimensional complex vector spaces on X. For X connected, the category of local systems is also equivalent to the category of complex representations of the fundamental group of X.
Thus such connections give a purely algebraic way to access the finite dimensional representations of the topological fundamental group.

The condition of regular singularities means that locally constant sections of the bundle (with respect to the flat connection) have moderate growth at points of Y − X, where Y is an algebraic compactification of X. In particular, when X is compact, the condition of regular singularities is vacuous.

More generally there is the

Riemann–Hilbert correspondence (for regular holonomic D-modules): there is a functor DR called the de Rham functor, that is an equivalence from the category of holonomic D-modules on X with regular singularities to the category of perverse sheaves on X.

By considering the irreducible elements of each category, this gives a 1:1 correspondence between isomorphism classes of

irreducible holonomic D-modules on X with regular singularities,
and
intersection cohomology complexes of irreducible closed subvarieties of X with coefficients in irreducible local systems.

A D-module is something like a system of differential equations on X, and a local system on a subvariety is something like a description of possible monodromies, so this correspondence can be thought of as describing certain systems of differential equations in terms of the monodromies of their solutions.

In the case X has dimension one (a complex algebraic curve) then there is a more general Riemann–Hilbert correspondence for algebraic connections with no regularity assumption (or for holonomic D-modules with no regularity assumption) described in Malgrange (1991), the Riemann–Hilbert–Birkhoff correspondence.

Examples

An example where the theorem applies is the differential equation

 

on the punctured affine line A1 − {0} (that is, on the nonzero complex numbers C − {0}). Here a is a fixed complex number. This equation has regular singularities at 0 and ∞ in the projective line P1. The local solutions of the equation are of the form cza for constants c. If a is not an integer, then the function za cannot be made well-defined on all of C − {0}. That means that the equation has nontrivial monodromy. Explicitly, the monodromy of this equation is the 1-dimensional representation of the fundamental group 1(A1 − {0}) = Z in which the generator (a loop around the origin) acts by multiplication by e2ia.

To see the need for the hypothesis of regular singularities, consider the differential equation

 

on the affine line A1 (that is, on the complex numbers C). This equation corresponds to a flat connection on the trivial algebraic line bundle over A1. The solutions of the equation are of the form cez for constants c. Since these solutions do not have polynomial growth on some sectors around the point ∞ in the projective line P1, the equation does not have regular singularities at ∞. (This can also be seen by rewriting the equation in terms of the variable w := 1/z, where it becomes

 

The pole of order 2 in the coefficients means that the equation does not have regular singularities at w = 0, according to Fuchs's theorem.)

Since the functions cez are defined on the whole affine line A1, the monodromy of this flat connection is trivial. But this flat connection is not isomorphic to the obvious flat connection on the trivial line bundle over A1 (as an algebraic vector bundle with flat connection), because its solutions do not have moderate growth at ∞. This shows the need to restrict to flat connections with regular singularities in the Riemann–Hilbert correspondence. On the other hand, if we work with holomorphic (rather than algebraic) vector bundles with flat connection on a noncompact complex manifold such as A1 = C, then the notion of regular singularities is not defined. A much more elementary theorem than the Riemann–Hilbert correspondence states that flat connections on holomorphic vector bundles are determined up to isomorphism by their monodromy.

In characteristic p

For schemes in characteristic p>0,  establish a Riemann-Hilbert correspondence that asserts in particular that étale cohomology of étale sheaves with Z/p-coefficients can be computed in terms of the action of the Frobenius endomorphism on coherent cohomology.

See also

 Riemann–Hilbert problem

References

  (Gives explicit representation of Riemann–Hilbert correspondence for Milnor fiber of isolated hypersurface singularity)
 
 
 
 
 
 
 

Differential equations
Representation theory
Bernhard Riemann